This article lists the confirmed squads for the 2016 Women's Hockey Junior World Cup tournament held in Santiago, Chile between 24 November and 4 December 2016.

Pool A

Netherlands
Head coach: Rick Mathijssen

Josine Koning (GK)
Maud Renders
Charlotte Adegeest
Hester van der Veld
Lisa Visser
Yentl Leemans
Fabienne Roosen
Pien Sanders
Maxime Kerstholt
Michelle Fillet
Kyra Fortuin
Frédérique Matla
Marie Burg
Pleun van der Plas
Ilse Kappelle
Imme van der Hoek
Maartje Krekelaar (C)
Anne Veenendaal (GK)

South Korea
Head coach: Kim Yong-soo

Lim Eun-hee (GK)
Mun Seung-hwa
Kim Min-ji
Kim Jin-mi
Kwon So-yeong
Lee Yu-ri
Kang Su-yeong
Moon So-yun
Kim Seo-yeong
Cho Hye-jin (C)
Cho Eun-ji
Kim Hyun-mi
Choi Seo-young
Jung Are-um
Kim Su-yeon
Lee Seung-ju
Hong Huig-yeong
Choi You-bin (GK)

United States
Head coach: Janneke Schopman

Brooke DeBerdine
Julianna Tornetta
<li value=5>Sophia Tornetta
<li value=5>Amanda Magadan
<li value=6>Erin Matson
<li value=7>Catherine Caro
<li value=9>Nicole Woods
<li value=10>Gabrielle Major
<li value=11>Lauren Moyer
<li value=12>Madeleine Bacskai
<li value=13>Ashley Hoffman
<li value=14>Laura Hurff
<li value=15>Margaux Paolino
<li value=16>Julia Young (C)
<li value=17>Caroline Hanks
<li value=18>Linnea Gonzales
<li value=31>Kelsey Bing (GK)
<li value=32>Jennifer Rizzo (GK)

Zimbabwe
The squad was announced on 26 September 2016.

Head coach: Patricia Davies

<li value=1>Jordyn Clipstone (GK)
<li value=2>Lauren Dent  (GK)
<li value=3>Carla van Oudtshoorn
<li value=4>Stephanie Capmbell (C)
<li value=5>Kelly Diplock
<li value=6>Jessica Dollar
<li value=7>Aimee-Beth Nativel
<li value=8>Megan Shaxson
<li value=9>Tyla Groenewald
<li value=10>Chelsea Dollar
<li value=11>Simone Herbst
<li value=12>Sinead Cockcroft
<li value=13>Sophie McDonald
<li value=14>Estelle Stambolie
<li value=15>Cheryl Dzapasi
<li value=16>Michelle Kabaira
<li value=18>Fariyah Omarshah 
<li value=19>Mufaro Mazambani

Pool B

Argentina
Head coach: Agustín Corradini

<li value=1>Cristina Cosentino (GK)
<li value=2>Sofia Toccalino
<li value=3>Agustina Gorzelany
<li value=4>Eugenia Trinchinetti
<li value=5>Agostina Alonso
<li value=6>Bianca Donati
<li value=7>Milagros Fernández
<li value=8>Bárbara Dichiara
<li value=9>Priscila Jardel
<li value=10>Magdalena Fernández
<li value=13>María Rosetti (GK)
<li value=14>Guadalupe Fernández
<li value=15>María Granatto
<li value=16>Lucia Sanguinetti
<li value=17>Bárbara Borgia
<li value=20>Lucina von der Heyde (C)
<li value=26>Maria Ortíz
<li value=28>Julieta Jankunas

France
Head coach: Cedric de Taeye

<li value=1>Clelia Deroo
<li value=2>Marine Delannoy
<li value=4>Emma Ponthieu (C)
<li value=5>Alice Demars
<li value=6>Victorine Vankemmel
<li value=8>Yohanna Lhopital
<li value=10>Elysee Lecas
<li value=11>Laetitia Canon
<li value=12>Ines Lardeur
<li value=14>Noa Roque
<li value=15>Shirley Lauret
<li value=16>Marie Simon
<li value=17>Victoria Struys
<li value=18>Gabrielle Verrier
<li value=20>Ines Brabant
<li value=28>Delfina Gaspari
<li value=31>Mathilde Petriaux (GK)
<li value=32>Manon Bruneau (GK)

Germany
The squad was announced on 10 November 2016.

Head coach: Marc Haller

<li value=1>Rosa Krüger (GK)
<li value=2>Noelle Rother (GK)
<li value=3>Emma Hessler
<li value=4>Hannah Gablać
<li value=5>Viktoria Huse (C)
<li value=6>Julia Meffert
<li value=7>Lena Micheel
<li value=9>Elisa Gräve
<li value=10>Kira Horn
<li value=12>Alisa Vivot
<li value=13>Teresa Martin-Pelegrina
<li value=14>Michelle Strobel
<li value=16>Lara Birkner 
<li value=17>Amelie Wortmann
<li value=18>Maike Schaunig
<li value=19>Maxi Marquardt 
<li value=21>Anelotte Ziehm 
<li value=22>Hanna Granitzki

Japan
The squad was announced on 4 October 2016.

Head coach: John Sheahan

<li value=1>Yu Asai (C)
<li value=2>Azusa Yokota
<li value=3>Ayaka Nishimura
<li value=4>Airi Nakahana
<li value=5>Mei Morikawa 
<li value=6>Chiko Fujibayashi
<li value=7>Natsuha Matsomoto
<li value=8>Yui Ishibashi
<li value=9>Seina Iwadate
<li value=10>Kimika Hoshi
<li value=11>Moeka Tsubouchi
<li value=12>Akiho Imao
<li value=13>Motomi Kawamura
<li value=14>Maho Segawa
<li value=15>Kanon Mori
<li value=16>Mai Toriyama 
<li value=17>Akio Tanaka (GK)
<li value=18>Eika Nakamura (GK)

Pool C

Australia
The squad was announced on 11 October 2016.

Head coach: Tim White

<li value=1>Rebecca Greiner
<li value=3>Greta Hayes
<li value=4>Madison Fitzpatrick
<li value=5>Mikaela Patterson
<li value=6>Laura Gray
<li value=8>Ambrosia Malone
<li value=9>Sophie Taylor
<li value=12>Michaela Spano
<li value=14>Kristina Bates
<li value=15>Kaitlin Nobbs
<li value=20>Savannah Fitzpatrick
<li value=21>Renee Taylor
<li value=23>Kate Hanna
<li value=24>Mariah Williams (C)
<li value=28>Karri Somerville
<li value=30>Grace Stewart
<li value=31>Aleisha Power (GK)
<li value=32>Rene Hunter (GK)

Chile
The squad was announced in October 2016.

Head coach: Alejandro Gómez

<li value=1>Sachi Ananías (GK)
<li value=2>Josefina Cambiaso
<li value=4>Fernanda Villagran
<li value=5>María Maldonado
<li value=6>Agustina Solano
<li value=7>Josefa Salas
<li value=8>Sophia Lahsen
<li value=9>Catalina Peragallo Papić
<li value=10>Sofía Machado
<li value=11>Paula Valdivia
<li value=12>Noemi Abusleme (GK)
<li value=13>Pilar Zapico
<li value=14>Antonia Morales
<li value=15>Doménica Ananías
<li value=17>Consuelo de las Heras
<li value=18>Denise Krimerman (C)
<li value=19>Florencia Martínez 
<li value=21>Kim Jacob

England
The squad was announced on 4 November 2016.

Head coach: Craig Keenan

<li value=1>Katherine Somerville (GK)
<li value=2>Miriam Pritchard (GK)
<li value=3>Alice Wills
<li value=4>Charlotte Calnan
<li value=5>Alicia Caillard
<li value=6>Charlotte Daly
<li value=7>Kathryn Lane (C)
<li value=8>Elizabeth Neal
<li value=9>Holly Hunt
<li value=10>Olivia Page
<li value=11>Holly Munro 
<li value=12>Megan Crowson
<li value=13>Ellie Rayer
<li value=14>Eloise Stenner
<li value=15>Esme Burge
<li value=16>Erica Sanders
<li value=17>Lydia MacDonell 
<li value=18>Harriet Mitchell

South Africa
The squad was announced on 5 August 2016.

Head coach: Bongani Tshutshani

<li value=1>Marlize van Tonder (GK)
<li value=2>Christine Seggie
<li value=3>Tarryn Glasby
<li value=4>Donna Small
<li value=5>Marguerite van Wyk
<li value=6>Danielle Cairns
<li value=7>Marizen Marais 
<li value=8>Kristen Paton
<li value=9>Shirndre-Lee Simmons
<li value=10>Marie Louw
<li value=11>Tegan Fourie 
<li value=12>Gretchin Davids
<li value=13>Ongeziwe Mali
<li value=14>Sisipho Magwaza (GK)
<li value=15>Natalie Esteves (C)
<li value=16>Nthabeleng Maine
<li value=17>Sandisiwe Tabata 
<li value=18>Marissa Poolman

Pool D

Belgium
Head coach: Xavier Reckinger

<li value=1>Elena Sotgiu (GK)
<li value=2>Elodie Picard (GK)
<li value=3>Alice Weicker
<li value=7>Daphne Gose
<li value=8>Lien Hillewaert
<li value=9>Pauline Leclef
<li value=10>Sophie Limauge 
<li value=11>Mathilde Raymakers
<li value=12>Marie Ronquetti
<li value=13>Estelle Meulemans
<li value=15>Cassy Boey 
<li value=16>Lauranne Struijk
<li value=17>Tiphaine Duquesne
<li value=18>Michelle Struijk 
<li value=19>Carolien Jakus 
<li value=20>Joanne Peeters
<li value=21>Stéphanie Vanden Borre (C)
<li value=22>Victoria de Kepper

China
Head coach: Weng Haiqin

<li value=2>Ou Zixia (C)
<li value=3>Shan Zhou 
<li value=4>Zhang Ying
<li value=6>Zhang Lijia
<li value=7>Guo Qiu
<li value=8>Zhou Yu
<li value=9>Xu Wenyu 
<li value=10>Chen Yang
<li value=11>Yuan Meng
<li value=12>Tu Yidan
<li value=13>Li Hong 
<li value=15>Liu Hua
<li value=20>Zhong Mengling
<li value=21>Zhong Jiaqi 
<li value=25>Tang Wanli 
<li value=29>Zhang Jinrong
<li value=31>Liu Kailin (GK)
<li value=32>Yu Yaran (GK)

New Zealand
The squad was announced on 17 October 2016.

Head coach: Sean Dancer

<li value=1>Maddison Dowe
<li value=2>Stephanie Dickins
<li value=3>Tarryn Davey
<li value=5>Megan Hull
<li value=6>Alia Jacques
<li value=7>Tessa Jopp (C)
<li value=8>Catherine Tinning
<li value=9>Amy Robinson
<li value=10>Frances Davies
<li value=11>Tyler Lench 
<li value=12>Maddi McLean
<li value=13>Kirsten Nation (GK)
<li value=14>Hattie Jones
<li value=15>Emily Wium
<li value=16>Phoebe Steele (C)
<li value=17>Deanna Ritchie 
<li value=18>Brooke Roberts (GK)
<li value=19>Kayla Reed

Spain
The squad was announced on 3 November 2016.

Head coach: Adrian Lock

[[Ana Calvo]] ([[Goalkeeper (field hockey)|GK]])
<li value=3>[[Clara Ycart]]
<li value=4>[[Constanza Amundson]]
<li value=7>[[Anna Gil]]
<li value=8>[[Clara Valle]]
<li value=9>[[Anna Fito]]
<li value=10>[[Florencia Amundson]]
<li value=11>[[Marta Grau]]
<li value=14>[[Alejandra Torres-Quevedo]]
<li value=15>[[Lara Pampín]] 
<li value=16>[[Candela Mejías]]
<li value=17>[[Mariona Serrahima]]
<li value=18>[[Paula Arrazola]]
<li value=19>[[Belén Iglesias]]
<li value=21>[[Marina Folch]] ([[Goalkeeper (field hockey)|GK]])
<li value=24>[[Begoña García Grau|Begoña García]] ([[Captain (sports)|C]])
<li value=28>[[Marta Segu|Marta Segú]]
<li value=29>[[Lucía Jiménez Vicente|Lucía Jiménez]]
{{div col end}}

References
{{reflist}}

{{Women's FIH Hockey Junior World Cup}}

[[Category:2016 Women's Hockey Junior World Cup|Squads]]
[[Category:Women's Hockey Junior World Cup squads]]